A notifiable disease is one which the law requires to be reported to government authorities.

In the United Kingdom, notification of infectious diseases is a statutory duty for registered medical practitioners and laboratories, under the Public Health (Control of Disease) Act 1984 and the Health Protection (Notification) Regulations 2010. Medical practitioners are required to notify their local authority of diseases on the list in writing within three days, or if the situation is urgent, by telephone within 24 hours.

List of notifiable diseases

The diseases notifiable to local authorities under the Health Protection (Notification) Regulations 2010 are:
 Acute encephalitis
  Acute infectious hepatitis
 Acute poliomyelitis
 Anthrax
 Botulism
 Brucellosis
 Cholera
 COVID-19
 Diphtheria
 Enteric fever
 Food poisoning
 Hemolytic uremic syndrome
 Infectious bloody diarrhoea
 Invasive group A streptococcal disease
 Legionnaire's disease
 Leprosy
 Malaria
 Measles
 Meningococcal sepsis
 Monkeypox
 Mumps
 Plague
 Rabies
 Rubella
 Severe Acute Respiratory Syndrome (SARS)
 Scarlet fever
 Smallpox
 Tetanus
 Tuberculosis
 Typhus
 Viral haemorrhagic fever (VHF)
 Whooping cough
 Yellow fever

List of notifiable organisms

The causative organisms which the laboratories shall notify to the proper authority under the Health Protection (Notification) Regulations 2010 are:
 Bacillus anthracis
 Bacillus cereus (only if associated with food poisoning)
 Bordetella pertussis
 Borrelia 
 Brucella 
 Burkholderia mallei
 Burkholderia pseudomallei
 Campylobacter 
 Chikungunya virus
 Chlamydophila psittaci
 Clostridium botulinum
 Clostridium perfringens (only if associated with food poisoning)
 Clostridium tetani
 Corynebacterium diphtheriae
 Corynebacterium ulcerans
 Coxiella burnetii
 Crimean-Congo haemorrhagic fever virus
 Cryptosporidium 
 Dengue virus
 Ebola virus
 Entamoeba histolytica
 Francisella tularensis
 Giardia lamblia
 Guanarito virus
 Haemophilus influenzae (invasive)
 Hanta virus
 Hepatitis A, B, C, delta, and E viruses
 Influenza virus
 Junin virus
 Kyasanur Forest disease virus
 Lassa virus
 Legionella 
 Leptospira interrogans
 Listeria monocytogenes
 Machupo virus
 Marburg virus
 Measles virus
 Mumps virus
 Mycobacterium tuberculosis complex
 Neisseria meningitidis
 Omsk haemorrhagic fever virus
 Plasmodium falciparum, vivax, ovale, malariae, knowlesi
 Polio virus (wild or vaccine types)
 Rabies virus (classical rabies and rabies-related lyssaviruses)
 Rickettsia 
 Rift Valley fever virus
 Rubella virus
 Sabia virus
 Salmonella 
 SARS coronavirus
 Shigella 
 Streptococcus pneumoniae (invasive)
 Streptococcus pyogenes (invasive)
 Varicella zoster virus
 Variola virus
 Verocytotoxigenic Escherichia coli (including E. coli O157)
 Vibrio cholerae
 West Nile virus
 Yellow fever virus
 Yersinia pestis

See also
 UK statutory notification system

References

External links
 Procedure for notification of diseases

Health law in the United Kingdom
Public health in the United Kingdom
United Kingdom
Infectious disease-related lists